Liolaemus pachacutec is a species of lizard in the family Iguanidae.  It is endemic to Peru.

References

pachacutec
Lizards of South America
Reptiles of Peru
Endemic fauna of Peru
Reptiles described in 2013
Taxa named by Jack W. Sites Jr.